The 1986–87 BHL season was the fifth season of the British Hockey League, the top level of ice hockey in Great Britain. 10 teams participated in the league, and the Murrayfield Racers won the league title by finishing first in the regular season. The Durham Wasps were playoff champions.

Regular season

Playoffs

Group A

Group B

Semifinals
Durham Wasps 7-5 Fife Flyers
Murrayfield Racers 9-6 Dundee Rockets

Final
Durham Wasps 9-5 Murrayfield Racers

References

External links
Season on hockeyarchives.info

1
United
British Hockey League seasons